Manoj Kumar Singh is an IAS officer who is currently posted as District Magistrate & Collector, Mahoba.

Early life and education
He was born as Manoj Kumar Singh to Digvijay Singh and Kela Devi. He hail from very humble background of agriculturist. He completed his primary education from primary school in his own village Sharifnagar of Thakurdwara Tehsil. Later he studied in Bijnor till class XII. He did B.A and L.L.B in K.G.K Inter College and Allahabad University.

Career
In 1997, he got selected as PCS officer after attaining 8th rank all over Uttar Pradesh and was promoted as 2012 batch IAS officer in 2019. He first joined as Sub-Divisional Magistrate (SDM) in Udham Singh Nagar district now in Uttarakhand. After Uttarakhand broke from Uttar Pradesh in 2000, he choose his home state Uttar Pradesh to be posted in.

Registrar of Chaudhary Charan Singh University
He was posted as Registrar at Chaudhary Charan Singh University in 2014 by the state government. After few months of his joining, he was at loggerhead with the University's Vice Chancellor, Vikram Chandra Goel a former DG rank IPS officer. VC relieved him from his post without getting any order from the state government. Later the government objected to it and ordered him to take back relieving order as it was out of his jurisdiction to do so. He replied that being a state university's VC he has autonomy from government and they can refer the matter to Chancellor/Governor of state. This tussle made students protest in the campus.

Later the Registrar appealed his decision to High Court where High Court reject VC's judgement and ordered Registrar to continue his duties. VC then appealed to Supreme Court but couldn't get favourable judgement. Post retirement of Vikram Chandra Goel from CCSU, the state government transferred Registrar as Joint Commissioner at UP Housing Development Board in Meerut.

Personal life
Married to the renowned writer Aakaanksha Singh in the year 1997, they have two children Pradyumna Singh and Meenakshi Singh. Currently, they are residing in Noida, Uttar Pradesh, India.

Posts held

See also
Kunwar Sarvesh Kumar Singh
Kunwar Sushant Singh
Kunwar Bhartendra Singh

References

Living people
1967 births
Indian Administrative Service officers
Indian government officials
Municipal Commissioners of India
People from Moradabad district